The position of Prime Minister of Indonesia existed from 1945 until 1966. During this period, the prime minister was in charge of the Cabinet of Indonesia, one of the three branches of government along with the People's Representative Council and the president. Following his 1959 decree, President Sukarno assumed the role and powers of prime minister until his resignation in 1966.

Indonesian National Revolution
On 18 August 1945, a day after the Proclamation of Indonesian Independence, Sukarno was appointed president and the 1945 Constitution of Indonesia came into force, which stated that Indonesia was built around a presidential system; as such, there were no constitutional provisions for a prime minister, and the cabinet was directly responsible to the president. However following Vice-Presidential Edict No.X, on 11 November the cabinet was made responsible to the provisional legislature, the Central Indonesian National Committee ( (KNIP)), effectively suspending the constitution. The cabinet was dismissed, and Sutan Sjahrir was asked to become the first prime minister. He agreed to do so on the condition he was allowed to select his own cabinet. The new cabinet was announced on 14 November with the understanding that although the prime minister was responsible to the Working Committee of the KNIP, he had to consult the president before making any major decisions. If the prime minister came into conflict with the KNIP or the president, another could be chosen.

Internal political disputes prompted Sjahrir to resign on 28 March, but he was asked to form the next cabinet. This fell in October, but yet again, Sjahrir agreed to continue as prime minister in the new cabinet. He finally resigned on 27 June, after being fatally weakened by concessions he had made to the Dutch following the signing of the Linggadjati Agreement. He was replaced by Amir Sjarifuddin, and Sjahrir became Indonesian representative at the United Nations. Sjariffuddin in turn resigned in turn following withdrawal of political support in the aftermath of the Renville Agreement. Sukarno then appointed vice-president Mohammad Hatta, asking him to form an emergency cabinet answerable to him rather than to the KNIP.

United States of Indonesia
On 27 December 1949, the Netherlands transferred sovereignty to a federal United States of Indonesia (RUSI), of which the Republic of Indonesia was one state. The Federal Constitution provided for a prime minister, and Hatta became the only prime minister of the RUSI. As this caused a vacuum of power in the Republican administration, Susanto Tirtoprodjo, justice minister in the previous cabinet, was appointed acting prime minister at the head of a transitional cabinet. On 22 January 1950, the new prime minister, announced his cabinet. The terms of both Hatta and Halim ended when the RUSI was dissolved and Indonesia became a unitary state on 17 August 1950 .

Liberal and Guided Democracy eras

Under the constitution of the unitary state, the cabinet was once again responsible to parliament, with the prime minister appointed by the president. Due to the instability of the coalition cabinets, prime ministers often faced votes of no confidence. Every major policy change had a chance to be opposed, either by the government or opposition. As such, some cabinets lasted only a few months.

On 5 July 1959, Sukarno issued a presidential decree declaring that, due to the inability of the Constitutional Assembly of Indonesia to decide on a new constitution, the 1945 Constitution would be reinstated. This removed the constitutional foundation for the office of Prime Minister. However, on 9 July of that same year, Sukarno took on the title of prime minister in addition to the presidency; later using the phrase "I am president and prime minister" as a dominant message in his speeches. After the abortive coup against the government in 1965 and the release of a document transferring all political power to Suharto, in 1967 Sukarno lost the title of prime minister together with the presidency.

List of prime ministers

Political parties

See also

President of Indonesia
List of presidents of Indonesia
Vice President of Indonesia
List of vice presidents of Indonesia
Deputy Prime Minister of Indonesia
Elections in Indonesia
Politics of Indonesia

Notes

References

Bibliography

External links

Indonesia
Lists of political office-holders in Indonesia

1945 establishments in Indonesia
1966 disestablishments in Indonesia
Lists of government ministers of Indonesia